Oktay Kaynarca (born 27 January 1965) is a Turkish actor. He is best known for his roles in the longest crime series Kurtlar Vadisi and Eşkıya Dünyaya Hükümdar Olmaz (2015–2021). His other hit series are "Yeditepe İstanbul" with ensemble cast and comedy crime  series "Adanalı" with Serenay Sarıkaya. He played in series "Ustura Kemal" based on comic book.

Overview 

In Turkey, Oktay Kaynarca is more recognized with his work in TV. He played "Süleyman Çakır" in the cult Turkish series Kurtlar Vadisi (Valley of the Wolves). His character was so sympathized that, when his character died in the series, his fans performed a funeral service in absentia.

He has a poem album called Ölümden Öte Köy Yok (There is no town further than death).

Filmography

Cinema and TV movies

TV series

TV programs

References

External links 
 Eski Diziler İzle - Eski Türk Dizileri Kanal D Arşiv'de
 

1965 births
Living people
Turkish male film actors
Turkish male television actors
Best Supporting Actor Golden Orange Award winners